Márcio Glad (born 23 September 1980 in Novo Horizonte, São Paulo), commonly known as Marcinho Guerreiro, is a Brazilian footballer who plays for Esporte Clube Santo André as a defensive midfielder.

Football career
During his early career, Guerreiro rarely settled with a club, representing Sociedade Esportiva Matonense, Guaratinguetá Futebol, Sociedade Esportiva do Gama and Figueirense Futebol Clube. In 2003, he established at Sociedade Esportiva Palmeiras, moving to FC Metalurh Donetsk in the Ukraine after four years but returning unsettled to Brazil shortly after, joining Santos FC on loan.

In November 2008, while at Real Murcia in the Spanish second division, Guerreiro assaulted the referee in a 3–5 loss at Xerez CD, after a penalty kick was awarded to the opposition and he was sent off for a second bookable offense. He was banned with four games, and fined by the club.

In October 2009, Guerreiro returned to his country, signing with for one year with Avaí Futebol Clube.

Honours
Santa Catarina State League: 2002, 2003
Brazilian Second Division: 2003

References

External links
 
 CBF data 
 
 

1980 births
Living people
Footballers from São Paulo (state)
Brazilian people of Ukrainian descent
Brazilian footballers
Association football midfielders
Campeonato Brasileiro Série A players
Campeonato Brasileiro Série B players
Campeonato Brasileiro Série D players
Ukrainian Premier League players
Segunda División players
Brazilian expatriate footballers
Expatriate footballers in Ukraine
Brazilian expatriate sportspeople in Ukraine
Expatriate footballers in Spain
Sociedade Esportiva Matonense players
Guaratinguetá Futebol players
Sociedade Esportiva do Gama players
Figueirense FC players
Sociedade Esportiva Palmeiras players
FC Metalurh Donetsk players
FC Arsenal Kyiv players
Santos FC players
Real Murcia players
Avaí FC players
Goiás Esporte Clube players
Clube de Regatas Brasil players
Ituano FC players
Esporte Clube Santo André players
Centro Sportivo Alagoano players
People from Novo Horizonte, São Paulo